Pierre Schapira may refer to:
 Pierre Schapira (politician)
 Pierre Schapira (mathematician)